O with macron (О̄ о̄; italics: О̄ о̄) is a letter of the Cyrillic script. In all its forms it looks exactly like the Latin letter O with macron (Ō ō Ō ō).

O with macron are used in the Evenki, Mansi, Nanai, Negidal, Orok, Ulch, Kildin Sami, Selkup, and Chechen languages.

O with macron also appears in the Transcarpathian dialect of  Carpatho-Rusyn, the only Slavic language to do so. In Carpatho-Rusyn, o with macron is pronounced like /oː/ being shifted towards /u/ at different grades. However, the use of this letter is not mandatory and it usually substituted with the Cyrillic letters O or I.

Computing codes
Being a relatively recent letter, not present in any legacy 8-bit Cyrillic encoding, the letter Ō is not represented directly by a precomposed character in Unicode either; it has to be composed as О+◌̄ (U+0304).

See also
O o : Latin letter O
Ō ō : Latin letter Ō - an archaic letter in Latvian, and a letter in Latgalian, Livonian, Samogitian, and Silesian
О о : Cyrillic letter О
Cyrillic characters in Unicode

References

Cyrillic letters with diacritics
Letters with macron